Akhtarul Iman (born 7 March 1964) is an Indian politician from the state of Bihar. He is a member of 17th Bihar Legislative Assembly, representing the Amour seat as MLA. He is also the Bihar State President of All India Majlis-e-Ittehadul Muslimeen (AIMIM).

Political career

1985-2015
Akhtarul Iman said that he entered politics when he was a student. In 1985, he joined a campaign led by Moulana Mohammad Hai against burglars and dacoits. Iman said that he joined the campaign as "the police and administration were hand in glove with them." In Bihar Assembly Elections February 2005, he contested from Kishanganj on a Rashtriya Janata Dal ticket and was elected. He also retained the seat in October 2005 election as well and remained as MLA of Kishanganj till 2010.

In 2010 he was elected as MLA from Kochadhaman and resigned in 2014. In February 2013, when students were being made to do the Yoga Asana of Surya Namaskar (allegedly bowing down to Hindu sun God Surya), Iman said that the government was trying to implement the Rashtriya Swayamsevak Sangh (a Hindu right wing organization) ideology in the state.

In 2014, he left Rashtriya Janata Dal (RJD) and joined Janata Dal (United). He contested from the Kishanganj seat as JD(U) candidate for the 16th Lok Sabha and lost the election to Asrarul Haq Qasmi.

2015-Present
In August 2015, Iman joined Hyderabad based All India Majlis-e-Ittehadul Muslimeen (AIMIM) and in November 2015, Iman was made a candidate for the party from the Kochadhaman seat in the 2015 Bihar Legislative Assembly election. In the rallies, the party workers hailed him as Sher-e-Bihar (Tiger of Bihar) and was projected as Bihar's Asaduddin Owaisi (the party's national chief). He said that if people of the Paswan and Yadav community (low caste Hindu communities) can have their own political parties, then Muslims should also have their own. He was also the party's president for Bihar state.
However, he lost the election to Mujahid Alam of Janata Dal (United). Iman polled 37,000 votes compared to Alam's 56,000.

In the Indian general election, 2019 Iman was a candidate for the AIMIM from the Kishanganj seat but he lost to Mohammad Jawed.

Iman became an MLA from Amour constituency in the 2020 Bihar Legislative Assembly election.

Positions held
Akhtarul Iman has served 4 times as MLA. He had lost the assembly election from Kochadhaman in 2015 as AIMIM candidate.

Iman also lost the Lok Sabha election from Kishanganj in 2014 and 2019.

References 

Living people
Bihar MLAs 2000–2005
Bihar MLAs 2005–2010
All India Majlis-e-Ittehadul Muslimeen politicians
Rashtriya Janata Dal politicians
Janata Dal (United) politicians
People from Kishanganj district
Bihar MLAs 2020–2025
Magadh University alumni
1964 births